The  is a Japanese design institution. Originally called the Japan Industrial Design Promotion Organization, it was founded in 1969 with the goal of promoting industrial design. It issues annual Good Design Awards.

See also 

 Japan Design Foundation
Good Design Award (Japan)

References

External links 
 

Design institutions
Industrial design
1969 establishments in Japan
Arts organizations established in 1969
Arts organizations based in Japan